Michael Paymar (born December 27, 1953) is a Minnesota politician and former member of the Minnesota House of Representatives. A member of the Minnesota Democratic–Farmer–Labor Party (DFL), he represented District 64B, which includes portions of the city of Saint Paul in Ramsey County, which is part of the Twin Cities metropolitan area. He is also a resource specialist for the Battered Women's Justice Project.

Early life, education, and career
Paymar graduated from East High School in Duluth, then went on to the College of St. Scholastica, also in Duluth, graduating with a B.A. in education and history. He later attended Hamline University in Saint Paul, earning his M.P.A. He served on the Duluth City Council from 1980 to 1988, and was council president in 1984. Later, after moving to Saint Paul, he served on the Saint Paul Charter Commission before being elected to the Legislature.

Minnesota House of Representatives
Paymar was first elected in 1996 and was reelected every two years thereafter until announcing on November 20, 2013, that he would not seek reelection in 2014. He was a member of the Committee on Law and Justice for the National Conference of State Legislatures and of the Public Safety and Justice Task Force for the Council of State Governments.

References

External links

 Michael Paymar official Minnesota House of Representatives website
 Michael Paymar official campaign website
 Minnesota Public Radio Votetracker: Rep. Mike Paymar
 Project Votesmart - Rep. Mike Paymar Profile

1953 births
Living people
Politicians from Saint Paul, Minnesota
Democratic Party members of the Minnesota House of Representatives
20th-century American Jews
College of St. Scholastica alumni
21st-century American politicians
21st-century American Jews